The 2001 Pitch and putt European Championship held in Lloret de Mar (Catalonia) was promoted by the European Pitch and Putt Association (EPPA), with 6 teams in competition.
Ireland won their second European Pitch and putt Championship.

Qualifying round

Pools round

Final round

Final standings

External links
European Pitch and Putt Championship 

Pitch and putt competitions
Pitch and putt European Championship